The Six Days of Groningen was a short-lived six-day track cycling race held annually in Groningen, Netherlands.

It was contested in the Martinihal Groningen from 1970 to 1972. After 2 successful editions, the public interest for the 1972 Six Days became so poor that the financial balance was negative.

In 1979, the race was organized again as part of an event Topsport' 79 (which also included basketball and athletics), but once more the public interest was minimal. It turned out to be the final edition.

Winners

External links 

Cycle races in the Netherlands
Six-day races
Recurring sporting events established in 1970
Recurring sporting events disestablished in 1979
1970 establishments in the Netherlands
1979 disestablishments in the Netherlands
Defunct cycling races in the Netherlands

References